Phanoptis donahuei is a moth of the family Notodontidae. It is found in southern Mexico.

The length of the forewings is 20–21.5 mm for males and 22.5–24 mm for females. The ground color of the forewings is dark chocolate brown to blackish brown, with a purplish iridescence. There is a hyaline area in basal third, cubitus and anal fold lined with blackish brown scales a they pass through. The anterior and outer margins of the hindwings are broadly banded with dark brown. The rest of the wing is hyaline. The veins are lined with dark brown.

Etymology
The species name honors Julian P. Donahue, curator emeritus of the entomology department at the Natural History Museum of Los Angeles County.

References

Moths described in 2008
Notodontidae